Zia-ur-Rehman Akbar (born 30 December 1997) is an Afghan cricketer.

Career
He made his List A debut for Afghanistan A against Zimbabwe A during their tour to Zimbabwe on 27 January 2017. He made his Twenty20 debut for Boost Defenders in the 2017 Shpageeza Cricket League on 11 September 2017. He made his first-class debut for Mis Ainak Region in the 2017–18 Ahmad Shah Abdali 4-day Tournament on 20 October 2017.

He finished the 2017–18 Ahmad Shah Abdali 4-day Tournament as the joint-leading wicket-taker, with a total of 55 wickets. He was the leading wicket-taker for Mis Ainak Region in the 2018 Ahmad Shah Abdali 4-day Tournament, with 46 dismissals in eight matches.

In September 2018, he was named in Paktia's squad in the first edition of the Afghanistan Premier League tournament. In December 2018, he was named in Afghanistan's under-23 team for the 2018 ACC Emerging Teams Asia Cup.

In February 2021, he was named in Afghanistan's Test squad for their series against Zimbabwe. In May 2022, he was named in Afghanistan's One Day International (ODI) squad for their series against Zimbabwe.

References

External links
 

1997 births
Living people
Afghan cricketers
Place of birth missing (living people)
Amo Sharks cricketers
Mis Ainak Knights cricketers
Paktia Panthers cricketers